A Man of Integrity is a 2017 Iranian drama film directed by Mohammad Rasoulof. It was screened in the Un Certain Regard section at the 2017 Cannes Film Festival where it won the main prize.

References

External links
 

2017 films
2017 drama films
Iranian drama films
2010s Persian-language films